Call or Calls may refer to:

Arts, entertainment, and media

Games
 Call, a type of betting in poker
 Call, in the game of contract bridge, a bid, pass, double, or redouble in the bidding stage

Music and dance 
 Call (band), from Lahore, Pakistan
 Call, a command in square dancing, delivered by a caller
 "Call / I4U", a 2011 single by Japanese music group AAA
 "Call", a 2002 song by Ashanti from her album Ashanti
 "Call" (Stray Kids song), 2021

Film 
 Call (film), or The Call, 2020 South Korean film
 Calls (film), 2021 Indian Tamil-language crime thriller film

Television 

 Calls (TV series), a mystery thriller TV series on Apple TV+

Finance
 Call on shares, a request for a further payment on partly paid share capital
 Call option, a term in stock trading

Places 

 Call, North Carolina, United States
 Call, Texas, United States

Science and technology

Computing
 Call, a shell command in DOS, OS/2 and Microsoft Windows command-line interpreters
 Call, a method of starting a subroutine
 Computer-assisted language learning, a concept in language education
 System call, in computer science, the mechanism used by an application program to request service from the operating system or another application program

Nature
 Animal communication, a song or noise made by an animal such as:
 Bird call, a type of bird vocalization
 Mating call, animal communication to attract a sexual partner
 Game call, a device that is used to  animal communication noises to attract or drive animals to a hunter

Telecommunications
 Call, an attempt to set up a telecommunication circuit
 Call, in teletraffic engineering, a unit of traffic measurement
 Call origination, in telephony
 Call sign, in broadcasting and radio communications, a unique designation for a transmitting station
 Telephone call

Other uses
 Call (surname)
 Religious calling
 Call, Texas, a community in the south-central United States
 CALL, U.S. Army Center for Army Lessons Learned
 CALL, Center for Anglican Learning & Leadership at the Church Divinity School of the Pacific

See also
 Caller (disambiguation)
 Calling (disambiguation)
 The Call (disambiguation)